This is a list of volcanic eruptions from Mauna Loa, an active shield volcano in the Hawaiian Islands that last erupted in 2022. These eruptions have taken place from the main caldera and fissures along rift zones. They are generally fluid (VEI-0) Hawaiian eruptions but more violent eruptions have occurred throughout Mauna Loa's eruptive history, with the largest recorded explosive eruptions having taken place in the 19th century.

Historically-observed eruptions
Data obtained from the Global Volcanism Program website.

Radiocarbon-dated eruptions
Data obtained from the Global Volcanism Program website.

References

eruptions
Mauna Loa
Mauna Loa
Mauna Loa
Mauna Loa
Mauna Loa
Mauna Loa
Mauna Loa
Mauna Loa eruptions